Group Facilitation: A Research and Applications Journal is a peer-reviewed academic journal covering all aspects of group facilitation and the repercussions for the individuals, groups, organizations, and communities involved. It is published by the International Association of Facilitators and the current editor-in-chief is Stephen Thorpe.

Overview 
The journal has the following sections: Application and Practice, containing articles that reflect on the facilitator experience; Theory and Research, containing articles that explore, propose, or test practices, principles, or other aspects of facilitation models; Edge Thinking, containing commentaries on new concepts and issues; and Book Reviews.

History 
The journal originally started production during 1996 when the IAF website was first launched. The first issue of the journal was officially published during the fall of 1999. Since this date, eleven issues have been published.

Abstracting and indexing 
The journal is abstracted and indexed in Business Source, ABI/INFORM, and ProQuest Central.

References

External links 
 

Publications established in 1999
Business and management journals
Annual journals
English-language journals
Academic journals published by learned and professional societies